Genevieve "Gen" Behrent (now Macky; born 25 September 1990) is a New Zealand rower.

Schooling
Behrent was born in Oamaru in 1990. She received her schooling at Southland Girls' High School in Invercargill. Behrent had planned to start her tertiary education at the University of Otago in 2010 when she received her call to the New Zealand rowing squad. She moved to Cambridge to be at the New Zealand training centre at Lake Karapiro and studied at the University of Waikato instead.

Rowing
She never took up rowing while at high school; it was at Lake Ruataniwha in November 2008 when she supported her younger brother at a rowing regatta that she was asked by Southland coach John O'Connor whether she wanted to try rowing herself as she had the right physical attributes. Only 14 months later, she was nominated for the New Zealand under-23 squad to compete at the 2010 World Rowing U23 Championships in Belarus, something that O'Connor termed "astonishing". Her brother, Oliver Behrent, went to the World Rowing Junior Championships in the same year. Her first club was the Waihopai Rowing Club in Southland and she later rowed for the University of Otago. Behrent took 2014 off from competitive rowing for tertiary study. She won a silver medal at the 2015 World Rowing Championships with the women's eight, qualifying the boat for the 2016 Olympics. She also competed in the coxless pair in Rio and with Rebecca Scown won silver, beaten by the Heather Stanning and Helen Glover of Great Britain. With the women's eight, she came fourth at the Rio Olympics. In November 2016, she announced that she would take 2017 off from rowing. She has started a career in the banking industry and did not return to rowing for the 2018 season either, but has not announced to Rowing New Zealand that she has retired from rowing.

References

External links
 
 

Living people
1990 births
New Zealand female rowers
People educated at Southland Girls' High School
World Rowing Championships medalists for New Zealand
Olympic rowers of New Zealand
Rowers at the 2016 Summer Olympics
Sportspeople from Oamaru
Medalists at the 2016 Summer Olympics
Olympic silver medalists for New Zealand
Olympic medalists in rowing
Massey University alumni
21st-century New Zealand women